The 1901 Detroit Tigers season was the Tigers' first in Major League Baseball. The team was a charter member of the American League, which was originally formed as the minor-league Western League, of which it had also been a charter member. The Tigers finished in third place with a record or 74–61,  games behind the Chicago White Stockings. Most of Detroit's home games were played at Bennett Park, with Sunday games played at Burns Park due to Detroit's blue laws.

Roscoe Miller (23–13) led the team in wins and was the Tigers' first 20-game winner. His performance headlined a strong pitching staff that had the third lowest ERA (3.30) in the American League. Joe Yeager had an ERA of 2.61, for the second best Adjusted ERA+ in the AL, behind Cy Young. The offense was not as strong however, scoring 741 runs – fifth among the eight teams in the league. The team's best hitters were shortstop Kid Elberfeld (.308 average) and center fielder Jimmy Barrett (.293 average; 110 runs).

Home field
The Tigers had played their games at Bennett Park since 1896, but the graduation to a major league meant that there would now be games scheduled on Sundays, which was forbidden by Detroit's blue laws. In order to avoid running afoul of this stricture, owner James D. Burns built a ballpark on his own property in Springwells Township, Michigan just outside the Detroit city limits. Named Burns Park, the Tigers would play their Sunday home games there for the 1901 and 1902 seasons.

1901 season

Pre-season
The following were key dates in the pre-season leading up to the Tigers' inaugural season:
 12/17/1900: The "Detroit Base Ball and Amusement Company" was incorporated for the term of 10 years, articles being filed with the county clerk on this date. The stated purposes of the new company were "the owning and improving of grounds and parks for base ball, foot ball, field-day sports, picnics and other forms of recreation and amusement."  The capital stock was $50,000 in 2000 shares issued to James D. Burns (900 shares), George Stallings (900 shares), Kathleen Burns (30 shares), Belle Stallings (30 shares), and attorney James McNamara (40 shares).  These five also composed the board of directors.
 1/28/01:  The composition of the American League circuit was confirmed as follows: Boston, Philadelphia, Baltimore, Washington, Chicago, Cleveland, Milwaukee and Detroit.  "Ten years' agreement signed and ground leases placed in Ban Johnson's hands."

Regular season highlights
The following were key dates in the regular season of the Tigers' inaugural season:
4/24/01: After years in the Western League, the Tigers were scheduled to take the field for their first official American League game on April 24, 1901. A standing room only crowd was anticipated at Bennett Park, but the Tigers' inaugural American League game was postponed due to weather. 
 4/25/01:  In their first major league game, the Tigers played in front of 10,023 fans in Detroit.  Detroit entered the ninth inning trailing the Milwaukee Brewers 13–4, but scored 10 runs in the bottom of the ninth inning to win the game, 14–13. Third basemen Doc Casey started the ninth-inning rally with a ground rule double. The Tigers continued the rally to eventually reduce their deficit to one run. Now only down one run, 13–12, with two runners on base and two out, Tiger Frank "Pop" Dillon hit a two-run double against reliever Bert Husting to defeat the Milwaukee Brewers by a score of 14–13.
4/25-28/01:  Detroit opened the season with a four-game series against Milwaukee.  The Tigers scored 45 runs on 61 hits and 81 bases. "Each contest was won by the Tigers in their last at bat, they securing 10, 2 and 4 runs in the ninth and 5 runs in the eighth."
4/29/01:  Detroit won its fifth consecutive game to open the season, defeating Chicago 3 to 2.  All three Detroit runs were scored on home runs in the sixth inning by Pop Dillon and Kid Elberfeld.
5/2/01:  Detroit scored five runs in the ninth inning to take a 7 to 5 lead over Chicago.  The game was declared a forfeit due to Chicago's dilatory tactics.  "The Chicagos, of the American League, tried to delay the game and forfeited to the Detroits.  Crowd rushed for Umpire, who took refuge in players' cage."
5/17/01:  Detroit defeated Cleveland 6 to 4.  The Tigers were in first place with a record of 16–5 after 21 games.
5/20/01:  Detroit defeated Cleveland 13 to 1.  The Tigers scored eight runs in the ninth inning off Bill Hart.
5/23/01:  The Tigers lost to Cleveland and fell out of first place for the first time.  After a hot start, the Tigers lost five out of six games between May 22 and 30.
5/31/01:  Detroit won by forfeit against Baltimore.  Ducky Holmes hit a home run in the ninth inning to tie the score.  The Orioles forfeit in an argument over Holmes' home run. "Baltimore forfeited to the Detroits after a squabble.  Catcher Wilson, of the Montreal team of the Eastern League, assaulted Umpire Hunt."
6/30/01:  Detroit attracted a crowd of 12,500, the largest of the season in Detroit.
7/3/01:  Detroit defeated Milwaukee, 7 to 5, in 16 innings.  Roscoe Miller pitched a complete game for the Tigers.
8/21/01:  Detroit declared the winner by forfeit after Baltimore pitcher Joe McGinnity stepped on the feet and spat in the face of umpire Connolly.  McGinnity was suspended until September 3.
8/27/01:  Detroit lost to Boston, 2 to 1, in 15 innings.
9/12/01:  Detroit defeated Cleveland, 5 to 4, with two runs in the ninth inning.
9/15/01:  Detroit defeated Cleveland 21 to 0 in the most one-sided game in the American League during the 1901 season.
9/29/01:  Season ended.

Attendance
During the 1901 season, Detroit attracted 259,430 fans at home and 238,100 on the road, for a total of 447,428.  Detroit ranked third behind Chicago and Boston in overall attendance.

Season standings

Record vs. opponents

Game log 

|- style="background:#bfb;"
|1 || April 25 || Brewers || 14–13 || 1–0
|- style="background:#bfb;"
| 2 || April 26 || Brewers || 6–5 || 2–0
|- style="background:#bfb;"
| 3 || April 27 || Brewers || 13–9 || 3–0
|- style="background:#bfb;"
| 4 || April 28 || Brewers || 12–11 || 4–0
|- style="background:#bfb;"
| 5 || April 29 || @White Stockings || 3–2 || 5–0
|- style="background:#fbb;"
| 6 || April 30 || @White Stockings || 2–4 || 5–1
|-

|- style="background:#bfb;"
| 7 || May 1 || @White Stockings || 9–19 || 5–2
|- style="background:#bfb;"
| 8 || May 2 || @White Stockings || 7–5 || 6–2
|- style="background:#bfb;"
| 9 || May 3 || Blues || 6–3 ||7–2
|- style="background:#fbb;"
| 10 || May 4 || Blues  || 4–11 || 7–3
|- style="background:#bfb;"
| 11 || May 5 || Blues || 10–3 || 8–3
|- style="background:#bfb;"
| 12 || May 6 || Blues || 5–4 || 9–3
|- style="background:#bfb;"
| 13 || May 7 || @Brewers || 9–2 || 10–3
|- style="background:#fbb;"
| 14 || May 9 || @Brewers || 6–7 || 10–4
|- style="background:#bfb;"
| 15 || May 10 || @Brewers || 7–6 || 11–4
|- style="background:#bfb;"
| 16 || May 11 || White Stockings  || 9–4 || 12–4
|- style="background:#bfb;"
| 17 || May 12 || White Stockings || 7–5 || 13–4
|- style="background:#bfb;"
| 18 || May 13 || White Stockings || 8–7 || 14–4
|- style="background:#fbb;"
| 19 || May 14 || White Stockings || 2–6 || 14–5
|- style="background:#bfb;"
| 20 || May 16 || @Blues || 5–2 || 15–5
|- style="background:#bfb;"
| 21 || May 17 || @Blues || 6–4 || 16–5
|- style="background:#fbb;"
| 22 || May 18 || @Blues  || 7–9 || 16–6
|- style="background:#fbb;"
| 23 || May 19 || Blues || 2–11 || 16–7
|- style="background:#bfb;"
| 24 || May 20 || @Blues || 13–1 || 17–7
|- style="background:#fbb;"
| 25 || May 22 || Americans || 5–9 || 17–8
|- style="background:#fbb;"
| 26 || May 23 || Americans || 2–4 || 17–9
|- style="background:#bfb;"
| 27 || May 24 || Americans || 3–0 || 18–9
|- style="background:#fbb;"
| 28 || May 25 || Senators || 5–6 || 18–10
|- style="background:#fbb;"
| 29 || May 27 || Senators || 4–8 || 18–11
|- style="background:#fbb;"
| 30 || May 30 || Orioles || 7–10 || 18–12
|- style="background:#bfb;"
| 31 || May 30 || Orioles || 4–1 || 19–12
|- style="background:#bfb;"
| 32 || May 31 || Orioles || *5 – 5 || 20–12
|-

|- style="background:#fbb;"
| 33 || June 1 || Orioles || 1–3 || 20–13
|- style="background:#fbb;"
| 34 || June 2 || @Athletics  || 8–11 || 20–14
|- style="background:#fbb;"
| 35 || June 3 || @Athletics || 1–2 || 20–15
|- style="background:#bfb;"
| 36 || June 4 || @Athletics || 9–1 || 21–15
|- style="background:#bfb;"
| 37 || June 5 || @Athletics || 3–2 || 22–15
|- style="background:#fbb;"
| 38 || June 8 || @Athletics || 1–6 || 22–16
|- style="background:#bfb;"
| 39 || June 10 || @Athletics || 5–4 || 23–16
|- style="background:#bfb;"
| 40 || June 11 || @Athletics || 4–1 || 24–16
|- style="background:#fbb;"
| 41 || June 12 || @Americans || 2–4 || 24–17
|- style="background:#bfb;"
| 42 || June 13 || @Americans || 11–6 || 25–17
|- style="background:#fbb;"
| 43 || June 14 || @Americans || 7–16 || 25–18
|- style="background:#fbb;"
| 44 || June 15 || @Americans || 4–12 || 25–19
|- style="background:#bfb;"
| 45 || June 17 || @Senators  || 9–2 || 26–19
|- style="background:#bfb;"
| 46 || June 18 || @Senators || 10–6 || 27–19
|- style="background:#fbb;"
| 47 || June 19 || @Senators || 2–7 || 27–20
|- style="background:#fbb;"
| 48 || June 20 || @Senators || 7–8 || 27–21
|- style="background:#fbb;"
| 49 || June 21 || @Orioles || 3–4 || 27–22
|- style="background:#fbb;"
| 50 || June 22 || @Orioles || 3–10 || 27–23
|- style="background:#fbb;"
| 51 || June 24 || @Orioles || 8–17 || 27–24
|- style="background:#fbb;"
| 52 || June 25 || @Orioles || 2–4 || 27–25
|- style="background:#bfb;"
| 53 || June 27 || Brewers || 4–3 || 28–25
|- style="background:#bfb;"
| 54 || June 28 || Brewers || 4–0 || 29–25
|- style="background:#bfb;"
| 55 || June 29 || Brewers || 5–0 || 30–25
|- style="background:#fbb;"
| 56 || June 30 || @White Stockings || 2–4 || 30–26
|-

|- style="background:#fbb;"
| 57 || July 2 || @White Stockings  || 2–3 || 30–27
|- style="background:#bfb;"
| 58 || July 3 || @Brewers || 7–5 || 31–27
|- style="background:#bfb;"
| 59 || July 4 || @Brewers || 5–1 || 32–27
|- style="background:#fbb;"
| 60 || July 4 || @Brewers || 7–8 || 32–28
|- style="background:#fbb;"
| 61 || July 5 || White Stockings || 4–8 || 32–29
|- style="background:#bfb;"
| 62 || July 6 || White Stockings || 6–5 || 33–29
|- style="background:#bfb;"
| 63 || July 7 || White Stockings || 8–3 || 34–29
|- style="background:#bfb;"
| 64 || July 9 || @Blues || 11–3 || 35–29
|- style="background:#bfb;"
| 65 || July 10 || @Blues || 7–4 || 36–29
|- style="background:#fbb;"
| 66 || July 11 || @Blues || 1–6 || 36–30
|- style="background:#fbb;"
| 67 || July 12 || Blues || 2–5 || 36–31
|- style="background:#bfb;"
| 68 || July 13 || Blues  || 19–12 || 37–31
|- style="background:#bfb;"
| 69 || July 14 || Blues || 5–0 || 38–31
|- style="background:#fbb;"
| 70 || July 16 || Senators || 5–8 || 38–32
|- style="background:#bfb;"
| 71 || July 17 || Senators || 4–3 || 39–32
|- style="background:#fbb;"
| 72 || July 18 || Senators || 6–8 || 39–33
|- style="background:#bfb;"
| 73 || July 19 || Senators || 7–3 || 40–33
|- style="background:#bfb;"
| 74 || July 20 || Americans || 8–6 || 41–33
|- style="background:#fbb;"
| 75 || July 21 || Americans || 3–4 || 41–34
|- style="background:#bfb;"
| 76 || July 22 || Americans || 6–5 || 42–34
|- style="background:#fbb;"
| 77 || July 24 || Athletics || 5–12 || 42–35
|- style="background:#bfb;"
| 78 || July 25 || Athletics || 4–3 || 43–35
|- style="background:#bfb;"
| 79 || July 27 || Orioles || 1–0 || 44–35
|- style="background:#bfb;"
| 80 || July 28 || Orioles || 6–4 || 45–35
|- style="background:#fbb;"
| 81 || July 29 || Orioles || 5–10 || 45–36
|- style="background:#fbb;"
| 82 || July 31 || @White Stockings || 0–2 || 45–37
|-

|- style="background:#fbb;"
| 83 || August 1 || @White Stockings || 0–4 || 45–38
|- style="background:#fbb;"
| 84 || August 2 || @White Stockings || 0–7 || 45–39
|- style="background:#bfb;"
| 85 || August 3 || @White Stockings || 8–6 || 46–39
|- style="background:#fbb;"
| 86 || August 4 || @Brewers || 3–4 || 46–40
|- style="background:#fbb;"
| 87 || August 4 || @Brewers || 4–11 || 46–41
|- style="background:#fbb;"
| 88 || August 5 || @Brewers || 4–19 || 46–42
|- style="background:#bfb;"
| 89 || August 6 || @Brewers || 8–4 || 47–42
|- style="background:#bfb;"
| 90 || August 7 || White Stockings || 9–3 || 48–42
|- style="background:#fbb;"
| 91 || August 8 || White Stockings  || 8–18 || 48–43
|- style="background:#bfb;"
| 92 || August 9 || White Stockings || 12–1 || 49–43
|- style="background:#fbb;"
| 93 || August 10 || Brewers || 3–4 || 49–44
|- style="background:#bfb;"
| 94 || August 11 || Brewers || 16–5 || 50–44
|- style="background:#fbb;"
| 95 || August 12 || Brewers || 4–6 || 50–45
|- style="background:#bfb;"
| 96 || August 16 || @Senators || 5–1 || 51–45
|- style="background:#fbb;"
| 97 || August 17 || @Senators || 1–5 || 51–46
|- style="background:#bfb;"
| 98 || August 17 || @Senators || 2–0 || 52–46
|- style="background:#fbb;"
| 99 || August 19 || @Orioles || 3–4 || 52–47
|- style="background:#bfb;"
| 100 || August 20 || @Orioles || 5–2 || 53–47
|- style="background:#bfb;"
| 101 || August 21 || @Orioles || *0 – 0 || 54–47
|- style="background:#fbb;"
| 102 || August 22 || @Athletics || 0–1 || 54–48
|- style="background:#fbb;"
| 103 || August 23 || @Athletics || 2–7 || 54–49
|- style="background:#bfb;"
| 104 || August 26 || @Americans || 6–3 || 55–49
|- style="background:#fbb;"
| 105|| August 27 || @Americans || 1–2 || 55–50
|- style="background:#bfb;"
| 106 || August 28 || @Americans || 4–2 || 56–50
|- style="background:#bfb;"
| 107 || August 29 || Americans || 5–3 || 57–50
|- style="background:#fbb;"
| 108|| August 30 || Americans || 4–5 || 57–51
|- style="background:#bfb;"
| 109|| August 31 || Americans || 6–5 || 58–51
|- bgcolor=
| 110|| August 31 || Americans || 4–4 || 58–51
|-

|- style="background:#fbb;"
| 111|| September 1 || Senators || 4–9 || 58–52
|- style="background:#bfb;"
| 112|| September 2 || Senators || 5–2 || 59–52
|- style="background:#bfb;"
| 113|| September 2 || Senators || 7–4 || 60–52
|- style="background:#fbb;"
| 114|| September 3 || Senators  || 2–4 || 60–53
|- style="background:#bfb;"
| 115|| September 4 || Athletics || 9–1 || 61–53
|- style="background:#fbb;"
| 116|| September 5 || Athletics || 9–11 || 61–54
|- style="background:#fbb;"
| 117|| September 5 || Athletics || 2–9 || 61–55
|- style="background:#bfb;"
| 118|| September 6 || Athletics || 8–3 || 62–55
|- style="background:#bfb;"
| 119|| September 7 || Orioles || 9–2 || 63–55
|- style="background:#bfb;"
| 120|| September 8 || Orioles || 8–5 || 64–55
|- style="background:#bfb;"
| 121|| September 9 || Orioles || 8–4 || 65–55
|- style="background:#bfb;"
| 122|| September 12 || @Blues || 5–4 || 66–55
|- style="background:#bfb;"
| 123 || September 12 || @Blues || 4–3 || 67–55
|- style="background:#bfb;"
| 124|| September 13 || @Blues || 7–0 || 68–55
|- style="background:#fbb;"
| 125|| September 14 || Blues || 3–5 || 68–56
|- style="background:#bfb;"
| 126|| September 15 || Blues || 21–0 || 69–56
|- style="background:#fbb;"
| 127|| September 17 || @Athletics || 1–4 || 69–57
|- style="background:#fbb;"
| 128|| September 20 || @Americans || 2–5 || 69–58
|- style="background:#bfb;"
| 129|| September 21 || @Americans || 3–1 || 70–58
|- style="background:#bfb;"
| 130|| September 22 || @Americans || 5–4 || 71–58
|- style="background:#bfb;"
| 131 || September 23 || @Americans || 9–2 || 72–58
|- style="background:#fbb;"
| 132|| September 24 || @Senators || 1–4 || 72–59
|- style="background:#fbb;"
| 133|| September 25 || @Senators || 2–3 || 72–60
|- style="background:#bfb;"
| 134|| September 26 || @Senators || 5–3 || 73–60
|- style="background:#fbb;"
| 135|| September 27 || @Orioles || 4–6 || 73–61
|- style="background:#bfb;"
| 136|| September 28 || @Orioles || 5–2 || 74–61
|-

Roster

Player stats

Batting

Starters by position 
Note: Pos = Position; G = Games played; AB = At bats; H = Hits; Avg. = Batting average; HR = Home runs; RBI = Runs batted in

Other batters 
Note: G = Games played; AB = At bats; H = Hits; Avg. = Batting average; HR = Home runs; RBI = Runs batted in

Note: pitchers' batting statistics not included

Pitching

Starting pitchers 
Note: G = Games pitched; IP = Innings pitched; W = Wins; L = Losses; ERA = Earned run average; SO = Strikeouts

Other pitchers 
Note: G = Games pitched; IP = Innings pitched; W = Wins; L = Losses; ERA = Earned run average; SO = Strikeouts

Awards and honors

League top five finishers 
 Jimmy Barrett: #5 in AL in runs scored (110)
 Jimmy Barrett: #3 in AL in bases on balls
 Jimmy Barrett: #4 in AL in times on base (240)
 Jimmy Barrett: #4 in AL in plate appearances (630)
 Doc Casey: #5 in AL in times hit by pitch (10)
 Jack Cronin: #5 in AL in bases on balls per 9 innings pitched (1.72)
 Jack Cronin: #4 in AL in strikeout to walk ratio (1.48)
 Ducky Holmes: #5 in AL in doubles (28)
 Roscoe Miller: #4 in AL in wins (23)
 Roscoe Miller: #3 in AL in innings pitched (332)
 Roscoe Miller: #5 in AL in games started (36)
 Roscoe Miller: #3 in AL in complete games (35)
 Roscoe Miller: #4 in AL in bases on balls allowed (98)
 Kid Nance: AL leader in sacrifice hits (24)
 Joe Yeager: #3 in AL in ERA (2.61)
 Joe Yeager: #2 in AL in Adjusted ERA+ (147)

References

External links
 1901 Detroit Tigers Regular Season Statistics at Baseball Reference

Detroit Tigers seasons
Detroit Tigers season
Detroit Tigers
1901 in Detroit